The Garrison Channel is one of several channels for boat traffic in and around the Port of Tampa in the City of Tampa, Florida. The Garrison Channel is anchored by the Channelside District on the East, leads to the Ybor and Sparkman Channel and by the Tampa Convention Center on its westside. It also leads itself to the Hillsborough River. The Garrison Channel is where the Waterside Marriott and Amalie Arena are located on the north bank, and Harbour Island is located at the south end of the Garrison Channel.

The  Tampa Bay History Center opened on the banks of the Garrison Channel in 2009.

References

Neighborhoods in Tampa, Florida